The 6th Golden Raspberry Awards were held on March 23, 1986, at the Morgan-Wixon Theatre in Santa Monica, California, to recognize the worst the movie industry had to offer in 1985. Though Rambo: First Blood Part II won Worst Picture, Rocky IV (also starring Sylvester Stallone) received the greatest number of nominations (9) and "wins" (5). This is the only year in which one movie won worst picture and another movie had the most nominations and wins.

Awards and nominations

Films with multiple nominations and wins 
The following films received multiple nominations:

These films received multiple awards:

See also

1985 in film
58th Academy Awards
39th British Academy Film Awards
43rd Golden Globe Awards

External links
Official summary of awards
Nomination and award listing  at the Internet Movie Database

Golden Raspberry Awards
06
1985 in American cinema
1986 in California
March 1986 events in the United States
Golden Raspberry